Nikolay Nikolayevich Sokolov (28 August 1930 – 2009) was a Soviet athlete who competed mainly in the 3000 metre steeplechase. Born in the village of Vasyunino, Vologodsky District, Vologda Oblast, he trained at Lokomotiv in Vologda. He competed for the USSR in the 1960 Summer Olympics held in Rome, Italy in the 3000 metre steeplechase where he won the silver medal.

External links
Biography and photo 
Biography of Nikolay Nikolayevich Sokolov 

1930 births
2009 deaths
Soviet male long-distance runners
Soviet male steeplechase runners
Olympic silver medalists for the Soviet Union
Athletes (track and field) at the 1960 Summer Olympics
Olympic athletes of the Soviet Union
European Athletics Championships medalists
Medalists at the 1960 Summer Olympics
Olympic silver medalists in athletics (track and field)